DCHP may refer to:

 A Dictionary of Canadianisms on Historical Principles
 Dicyclohexyl phthalate, a phthalate

Not to be mistaken for DHCP